Zodion obliquefasciatum is a species of thick-headed flies in the family Conopidae.

References

Conopidae
Articles created by Qbugbot
Insects described in 1846